Subarnakhal is a small town in Arghakhanchi District in the Lumbini Zone of southern Nepal. At the time of the 1991 Nepal census it had a population of 3,020 and had 556 houses in the town.

References

Populated places in Arghakhanchi District